Fuat Ergin (born 30 October 1972), is a Turkish rapper and songwriter.

Discography 
1999: Hassickdir
2001: Hassickdir 2
2002: Bonobo 1 Panzer
2002: Hassickdir 3
2003: Rapüstad (split album with Killa Hakan)
2005: Her Ayın Elemanı
2009: Kalbüm
2019: Omurga 1, Omurga 2
2021: Krematoryum EP
2022: 50 Kalibre

References 

Living people
1972 births
German people of Turkish descent
Turkish rappers
Turkish hip hop
Turkish lyricists
Turkish male singers